The Men's 200m T13 had its First Round held on September 15 at 9:46 and its Final on September 16 at 19:28.

Medalists

Results

References
Round 1 - Heat 1
Round 1 - Heat 2
Final

Athletics at the 2008 Summer Paralympics